The canton of Sault is a French former administrative division in the department of Vaucluse and region Provence-Alpes-Côte d'Azur. It had 3,374 inhabitants (2012). It was disbanded following the French canton reorganisation which came into effect in March 2015. It consisted of 5 communes, which joined the canton of Pernes-les-Fontaines in 2015.

Composition
The communes in the canton of Sault:
Aurel
Monieux
Saint-Christol
Saint-Trinit
Sault

References

Sault
2015 disestablishments in France
States and territories disestablished in 2015